Marshall Township is a civil township of Calhoun County in the U.S. state of Michigan. It is part of the Battle Creek, Michigan Metropolitan Statistical Area. The population was 3,115 at the 2010 census. The city of Marshall is adjacent to the township, but is administratively autonomous.

Geography
Marshall Township is located just north of the center of Calhoun County and is bordered on the southeast by the city of Marshall. The unincorporated community of Ceresco lies along the western boundary of the township. Interstates 94 and 69 cross near the center of the township; I-94 leads west  to Battle Creek and east  to Jackson, while I-69 leads northeast  to Lansing and south  to Coldwater.

The Kalamazoo River flows from east to west across the southern part of the township.

Demographics

As of the census of 2000, there were 2,922 people, 1,081 households, and 874 families residing in the township. The racial makeup of the township was 97.13% White, 0.27% African American, 0.27% Native American, 0.65% Asian, 0.10% Pacific Islander, 0.27% from other races, and 1.30% from two or more races. Hispanic or Latino of any race were 1.68% of the population.

There were 1,081 households, out of which 35.3% had children under the age of 18 living with them, 73.4% were married couples living together, 5.0% had a female householder with no husband present, and 19.1% were non-families. 16.5% of all households were made up of individuals, and 7.5% had someone living alone who was 65 years of age or older.  The average household size was 2.69 and the average family size was 3.00.

In the township the population was spread out, with 25.3% under the age of 18, 6.0% from 18 to 24, 25.9% from 25 to 44, 29.5% from 45 to 64, and 13.3% who were 65 years of age or older.  The median age was 41 years. For every 100 females, there were 101.0 males.  For every 100 females age 18 and over, there were 96.0 males.

The median income for a household in the township was $56,563, and the median income for a family was $66,105. Males had a median income of $44,074 versus $32,500 for females. The per capita income for the township was $25,163.  About 4.7% of families and 5.0% of the population were below the poverty line, including 4.2% of those under age 18 and 1.8% of those age 65 or over.

References

External links
Marshall Township official website

Townships in Calhoun County, Michigan
Townships in Michigan